Tommy Walsh (born 18 December 1956), is an English television personality, presenter and celebrity builder best known for the gardening and do-it-yourself television shows Ground Force (1997–2005) and Challenge Tommy Walsh.

Biography
Educated at Parmiter's School, then a grammar school in Bethnal Green, Walsh became a builder and first came to public attention after appearing in the BBC television gardening programme Ground Force with Alan Titchmarsh, responsible for the hard landscaping. He stayed with the show for the rest of its run, from 1997 to 2005.

Walsh had a small acting role in the film One. He has also appeared on Lily Savage's Blankety Blank.

Personal life 
Walsh lives in South Hackney, with his wife and three children. In addition to his television work, he runs his own building business and writes books on do-it-yourself and garden improvement. He also has his own DIY brand that is sold in Poundland shops in the UK.

He is patron of the Stairway to Heaven Memorial Trust, and is the subject of the song "Tommy Walsh's Eco House" on the 2011 album 90 Bisodol (Crimond) by the band Half Man Half Biscuit.

Television work 
Walsh has presented several Television shows, including:

 Challenge Tommy Walsh (with Alan Herd)
 Space Invaders
 Tommy Walsh's Eco House
 Trading Places
 Tommy's Ultimate Workshop
 Tommy's DIY Survival
 The Reclaimers
 Ground Force
 Our House
 Fix Your House For Free
 Celebrity Fit Club
 Flip That House with Tommy Walsh
 My Life as a DIY Nutter (Channel 5)
 Cowboys & Angels (BBC)
 Me and my son Greg (2017)
 Homes Under the Hammer
 Clean It, Fix It

Publications

Ground Force: Practical Garden Projects (2000), BBC Books
Ground Force: Garden Handbook (2001), BBC Books - with Alan Titchmarsh and Charlie Dimmock
Tommy Walsh's DIY Guide (2001), Focus Multimedia Ltd - CD-ROM
Basic DIY (2002), Collins
DIY Survival (2002), Collins
Bathroom DIY (2004), Collins
Kitchen DIY (2004), Collins
Living Spaces DIY (2004), Collins
Outdoor DIY (2004), Collins

References

External links
UKTV Gardens profile
Interview on 'Love food, hate waste'

1956 births
Living people
English television presenters
English people of Irish descent
People from South Hackney
People educated at Parmiter's School, London